William E. "Bill" Dykes (October 23, 1925 – February 23, 2015) was a Democratic former state senator from his native St. Helena Parish, Louisiana, who represented his state's 11th District from 1972 to 1984. Prior to his legislative service, he had been mayor of Montpelier, Louisiana.

The son Jesse and Willa Mae Dykes, he graduated in 1941 from the since defunct Pine Grove High School in St. Helena Parish. The school was then under the principalship of John E. "Prof" Lisenby. He later attended Southeastern Louisiana University in Hammond.

After service in World War II, Dykes in 1946 founded W. E. Dykes Feed & Dairy Supplies, later Dykes Feed & Fertilizer, in Amite in Tangipahoa Parish. He and his late wife, the former Ivyne Alessi, had two children. Bryan E. Dykes, Sr. (1947–2011), who was married to the former Gloria Mack, was also a feed and fertilizer businessman and a ten-year mayor of Montpelier, where Bill Dykes resided. The Dykes' surviving daughter and son-in-law are Billie Claire Dykes Tycer and James Herndon Tycer.

Dykes was a charter board member of the St. Helena Parish Hospital and a member on the Louisiana State Hospital Board. In the state Senate, he was the chairman of the Agriculture Committee.

After the 1980 United States census, Dykes was moved into District 12, the same constituency with Sixty Rayburn, a behemoth of the legislature, against whom Dykes stood little likelihood of winning. The redistricting was required to accommodate increased representation by African-Americans, and District 11 was reassigned to the corridor from Hammond to Slidell. The seat went to the Democrat, later Republican convert, Gerry E. Hinton. When state Senator Thomas H. Hudson of Baton Rouge, the chairman of the committee which had overseen the redistricting, became the Democratic candidate for Louisiana's 6th congressional district in 1986, Dykes worked for the successful election of GOP candidate Richard Hugh Baker, a member of the Louisiana House of Representatives. In 1986, Dykes' residence was not in the 6th District (St. Helena was reapportioned in December 1983 into the 8th district), but delivery trucks from his farm-supply business could be seen throughout that district festooned with Richard Baker signs. Rayburn, meanwhile, remained in the legislature until his own defeat in 1995 by Republican Phil Short.

On April 23, 1988, Dykes shot and killed Harold Bernard Vige in Montpelier, La. This incident was classified as a "hunting accident".

Notes

1925 births
2015 deaths
Farmers from Louisiana
Baptists from Louisiana
Businesspeople from Louisiana
Democratic Party Louisiana state senators
Mayors of places in Louisiana
People from St. Helena Parish, Louisiana
Southeastern Louisiana University alumni
20th-century American businesspeople
20th-century Baptists
Burials in Louisiana